Hadrach is a Biblical name, denoting a place, a king or a deity revered on the boundaries of Damascus. It is only mentioned once in the bible: Zechariah 9:1. It is generally thought to have been North of Lebanon.

According to George L. Klein, Hadrach has been identified with the Assyrian place-name Hatarikka, or Aramean Hazrik, (the capital of Luhuti) possibly located at Tell Afis.

See also
 List of biblical names starting with H
Luhuti
 Tell Afis

References

Sources

s:Encyclopaedia Biblica/Gothoniel-Haggi#HADRACH

Hebrew Bible places